Lauri Lepik (born 14 October 1960 in Tallinn) is an Estonian diplomat and civil servant.

Biography 
He graduated from Tallinn 7th Secondary School. In 1985, he graduated from the Tallinn Pedagogical Institute with a diploma thesis in the field of librarianship and bibliography "Use of databases in environmental information services".

In 1987–1992, he was the research director of the Estonian National Library.

In 2003, he graduated from Humboldt University in political sciences. He was a member of the board of the re-established Estonian Librarians' Association. In 1992–1995 he worked at the State Chancellery.

Diplomatic posts:
 2011-2012 – Ambassador of Estonia to Ukraine and to Moldova.
 Since 2012 – Permanent Representative of Estonia to North Atlantic Council. 
 Since 2017 – Ambassador of Estonia to the United States.

References

Living people
1960 births
Estonian diplomats
Ambassadors of Estonia to Ukraine
Ambassadors of Estonia to Moldova
Ambassadors of Estonia to the United States
Tallinn University alumni
People from Tallinn